Judy Rabinowitz (born April 9, 1958, in Fairbanks, Alaska) is an American cross-country skier who competed from 1982 to 1984. She finished seventh in the 4 × 5 km relay at the 1984 Winter Olympics in Sarajevo.

Rabinowitz's best World Cup career finish was ninth in a 10 km event in the United States in 1983.

She graduated from Harvard University and Harvard Law School.

Cross-country skiing results
All results are sourced from the International Ski Federation (FIS).

Olympic Games

World Cup

Season standings

References

Sports-reference.com profile
Women's 4 x 5 km cross-country relay Olympic results: 1976-2002

External links

1958 births
Living people
American female cross-country skiers
American people of Latvian-Jewish descent
Cross-country skiers at the 1984 Winter Olympics
Jewish American sportspeople
Olympic cross-country skiers of the United States
Sportspeople from Fairbanks, Alaska
Harvard Law School alumni
21st-century American Jews
21st-century American women
Harvard College alumni